Perseus (212 – 166 BC) was the last king (Basileus) of the Antigonid dynasty, who ruled the successor state in Macedon created upon the death of Alexander the Great. He was the last Antigonid to rule Macedon, after losing the Battle of Pydna on 22 June 168 BC; subsequently, Macedon came under Roman rule.

Early life
Perseus was the son of king Philip V of Macedon and a concubine, probably Polycratia of Argos. His father spent most of his reign attempting to maintain Macedonian hegemony over Greece against heavy Greek resistance and, in his later reign, against a expansionist Roman Republic. In this regard Philip V would fail as following defeat in the Second Macedonian War, he would have to accept Roman power in Greece and would later help Rome in the War against Nabis (195 BC) and Aetolian War (191-189 BC). Perseus is recorded as having commanded Macedonian troops in both the Second Macedonian War and Aetolian War. Being a son of a concubine, Perseus feared that the throne might pass on to his legitimate younger brother Demetrius, who had been sent as a hostage to Rome following the Second Macedonian War and now led a Pro Roman faction within the Macedonian court. In 180 BC Perseus forged a letter supposedly from the Roman general Titus Quinctius Flamininus which suggested that Demetrius was planning to overthrow Philip V. This successfully convinced Philip V to execute Demetrius. Philip would die the next year and was succeeded by Perseus.

Reign

Soon Rome and Perseus went to war in the Third Macedonian War (171-168 BC). Although Perseus had some initial success, the war ended with the King's surrender to the Roman general Lucius Aemilius Paullus after his decisive defeat at the Battle of Pydna, and his eventual imprisonment in Rome with his half-brother Philippus and son Alexander. Blaise Pascal mentions in his Pensées (Lafuma 15) that Perseus was blamed for not committing suicide, supposedly after his defeat at Pydna. The Antigonid kingdom was dissolved, and replaced with four republics. Perseus was led as a captive in the triumph of Paullus, then thrown in prison, where – according to Plutarch – after two years, the Romans decided to kill him, and had him kept from sleeping to the point that he died from exhaustion in 166 BC. Livy, however, writes that he was shown clemency, and kept in good conditions at Alba Fucens for the rest of his life.

In 178 BC, he had married Laodice V, the daughter of Seleucus IV from Syria. One son of Perseus and Laodice, Alexander was still a child when Perseus was defeated by the Romans, and after the triumph of Aemilius Paullus in 167 BC, was kept in custody at Alba Fucens, together with his father. He became a skillful metalworker, learned the Latin language, and became a public notary.

Legacy 

In 149 BC, Andriscus, claiming to be Perseus' son, announced his intention to retake Macedonia from the Romans. He broke off the Roman rule for about a year, but was defeated in 148 BC by the Romans, thereby ending the reign of the last Macedonian king. In 146 BC, the four republics were dissolved, and Macedon officially became the Roman province of Macedonia.

See also
 History of Macedonia (ancient kingdom)
 Macedonian Wars

References

Bibliography 

 Oliver D. Hoover, Handbook of Coins of Macedon and Its Neighbors. Part I: Macedon, Illyria, and Epeiros, Sixth to First Centuries BC [The Handbook of Greek Coinage Series, Volume 3], Lancaster/London, Classical Numismatic Group, 2016.

External links

 

Ancient Macedonian monarchs
2nd-century BC rulers in Europe
2nd-century BC Macedonian monarchs
2nd-century BC Greek people
Antigonid dynasty